The Cellar Door was a 163-seat music club located at 34th & M Street NW in the Georgetown neighborhood of Washington, D.C. from 1964  through January 7, 1982. It occupied the location of a former music club called The Shadows.

One of the premier music spots in Washington, D.C., the small club served as the genesis for entertainers and as a tryout venue for larger markets. Many artists cut their professional teeth performing at The Cellar Door, while audiences delighted in being within a few feet of the stage at the tiny venue. Many music and comedy notables in 1960s and 1970s performed there.

Notable recordings
Some performances at The Cellar Door were recorded and released. Albums based on live sets there include:
 In Person by Bud & Travis, 1964
 Live-Evil by Miles Davis, 1970 (later expanded into The Cellar Door Sessions 1970, released 2005)
 Live at the Cellar Door by Richie Havens, recorded 1970, released 1990
 Live at the Cellar Door by Neil Young, recorded 1970, released 2013
 FM & AM by George Carlin, 1972 (won the Grammy Award for Best Comedy Album)
 Live at The Cellar Door by The Seldom Scene, 1975, considered their signature live album
 The Redneck Jazz Explosion by Danny Gatton, 1978

Notable artists

Some of the notable artists who played there include:
 The Coasters
 John Abercrombie
 Billy Joel
 America in their first American appearance
 Joan Armatrading
 Artful Dodger
 Jackson Browne
 Brewer and Shipley
 Brecker Brothers
 Aztec Two-Step
 Bud & Travis
 Allen Collins Band 1983
 Jimmy Buffett
 JJ Cale
 George Carlin
 Harry Chapin
 Cheech and Chong
 Chick Corea
 Larry Coryell
 Bill Cosby (warm-up comic for the Mitchell Trio with John Denver)
 The Country Gentlemen
 Jim Croce
 Miles Davis
 John Denver (He sang his "Leaving, On A Jet Plane" there prior to being released by Peter, Paul and Mary. "Take Me Home, Country Roads" was sung for the general public for the first time anywhere at the club on December 30, 1970.)
 The Joy of Cooking
 Stevie Wonder
 The Everly Brothers
 Mort Sahl
 The Dillards
 Fat City (later to become the Starland Vocal Band)
 Doc and Merle Watson
 Gabe Kaplan
 Neil Sedaka
 John Fahey
 David Mallett
 The Flying Burrito Brothers
 The Newgrass Revival
 Paul Siebel
 Danny Gatton
 Steve Goodman
 Great Speckled Bird (Ian & Sylvia)
 Happy The Man
 Richie Havens
 Rick Nelson
 Pete Kennedy
 B.B. King
 Carole King
 Ramsey Lewis Trio
 Gordon Lightfoot
 Ian & Sylvia
 Les McCann
 Roger McGuinn
 Charlie Mingus
 Chad Mitchell Trio
 Judy Collins
 Joni Mitchell
 Modern Jazz Quartet
 Anne Murray
 Rick Nelson
 Gram Parsons (Performed with a backing band at The Cellar Door. At the time, looking for a female vocalist for duets, his bandmates ran across Emmylou Harris at a small neighboring bar performing cover songs. Their introduction was the real start of Harris' career and a boost for Parsons' act.)
 Les Paul
 Minnie Riperton
 Lee Ritenour
 Carly Simon
 Tom Paxton
 Pointer Sisters
 Tom Principato
 John Prine
 Richard Pryor
 Bonnie Raitt in 1969.
 Linda Ronstadt (her band was made up of later members of The Eagles)
 Buddy Rich
 Chris Rush
 Tom Rush
 John Sebastian
 Shakti w/ John McLaughlin
 Patti Smith
 Stephanie Mills
 Tommy Smothers
 David Steinberg
 The Stone Poneys
 Taj Mahal
 James Taylor
 Livingston Taylor
 Nighthawks Jimmy Thackery
 George Thorogood
 Mary Travers
Paul Davis (as a warmup for Mary Travers)
 Muddy Waters
 Tom Waits
 Glenn Yarbrough
 Neil Young
 Brand X
 Warren Zevon
 Donal Leace
 Gladys Knight and the Pips
 Leo Kottke
 The Persuasions

Some music was written on site. Bill Danoff and Taffy Nivert (as Fat City) opened for John Denver in December 1970.  Late one night, Denver helped finish writing a song that Danoff and Nivert had started. They debuted "Take Me Home, Country Roads" on December 30, 1970.

Closing
In January 1981, The Cellar Door was sold for an undisclosed sum to Paul Kurtz and Howard Bomstein from Washington, D.C. Ultimately, the club was closed down by the Washington, D.C. fire marshal after numerous warnings. Licensed for 163 seats, it had occasionally admitted more than 200 people SRO. Also, the books for liquor sales were allegedly being done improperly: so instead of making money, a fair amount of money was being lost unbeknownst to the club owners.

Cellar Door Productions
The Cellar Door Nightclub was a partnership between Jack Boyle and Sam L'Hommedieu Jr. The pair also owned two other popular Georgetown nightspots, The Crazy Horse and The Bayou, as well as The Stardust, a music club in Waldorf, Maryland. They went on to found Cellar Door Productions, which became the largest concert promoter from Baltimore to Florida, with offices in Washington D.C., Ft. Lauderdale FL, Myrtle Beach, SC, and Detroit. Bill Reid was president of Cellar Door Productions from 1983 until his firing in 1997. The Cellar Door Cos. were sold to SFX Entertainment in 1999. Cellar Door developed the Nissan Pavilion concert venue, now called the Jiffy Lube Live, west of Washington, DC. The mailing address of Jiffy Lube Live (now owned by Live Nation) is 7800 Cellar Door Drive.

Boyle continued with SFX after it was purchased by Clear Channel Entertainment and is now retired.  L'Hommedieu managed the Warner Theatre (Washington, D.C.) during the 1980s.

Later tenants
When the Cellar Door ceased operating, a comedy club was announced as the next tenant. However, mayor Marion Barry learned that Mafia money was involved, and decided not to grant a liquor license.  A few years later, Cafe Seynabou, a restaurant featuring the cuisine of Senegal, opened at the site, but it closed within 24 months. It stayed vacant for quite some time after that. It eventually hosted the Philadelphia Cheesesteak Factory until May 2009, then Capriotti's Sandwich Shop in 2014. 

In 2017, Starbucks announced plans to take over the vacant 2,600-square-foot space. Alec Berkman, BISNOW national contributor reported on July 17, 2017 that before its summer break, in June, the Georgetown-Burleith Advisory Neighborhood Commission approved design plans for a Starbucks store. The commission was initially opposed to Starbucks’ signage. However, its opposition was reversed when Starbucks corporate gave a commitment to honor the Cellar Door by exhibiting photos of the many entertainment acts that appeared at the venue over its years of operation at the historic location.

References

Nightclubs in Washington, D.C.
Music venues in Washington, D.C.
Demolished buildings and structures in Washington, D.C.